This is a list of types of inflammation in the body when organised by location.

Nervous system

CNS 
 Encephalitis/Cerebritis
 Myelitis
 Meningitis
 Cerebellitis
Ventriculitis

PNS 
 Neuritis

Eye 
 Dacryoadenitis
 Dacryocystitis
 Conjunctivitis
 Scleritis
 Episcleritis
 Uveitis
 Blepharitis
 Keratitis
Retinitis/Chorioretinitis

Ear 
 Otitis
Labyrinthitis
Otitis media
Otitis Externa

Cardiovascular system 
 Carditis
 Endocarditis
 Myocarditis
 Pericarditis
 Vasculitis
 Arteritis
 Phlebitis
 Capillaritis
Aortitis

Respiratory system 
 Sinusitis
 Rhinitis
 Pharyngitis
 Epiglottitis
 Laryngitis
 Tracheitis
 Bronchitis
 Bronchiolitis
 Pneumonitis
 Pneumonia
 Pleurisy

Digestive system 
 Stomatitis
 Cheilitis
 Glossitis
 Tonsillitis
 Sialadenitis
 Parotitis
 Gingivitis
 Pulpitis
 Pericoronitis
 Gnathitis
 Oesophagitis
 Gastritis
 Gastroenteritis
 Enteritis
Duodenitis
Jejunitis
Ileitis
 Colitis
 Pancolitis
 Appendicitis
 Cryptitis
 Proctitis
 Diverticulitis
 Hepatitis
 Viral hepatitis
 Alcoholic hepatitis
 Autoimmune hepatitis
 Cholecystitis
Cholangitis
 Pancreatitis
Peritonitis
 Mediastinitis

Integumentary system 
 Dermatitis
 Cellulitis
 Erysipelas
 Mastitis
 Onychia
 Folliculitis
 Omphalitis

Musculoskeletal system 
 Arthritis
Sacroilitis
 Myositis
 Osteitis/Osteomyelitis
Spondylitis
 Chondritis
 Synovitis
 Tendinitis
 Tenosynovitis
 Bursitis
 Perichondritis
 Fasciitis
 Enthesitis
 Discitis
 Dactylitis

Urinary system 
 Nephritis
Pyelonephritis
Interstitial Nephritis
Glomerulonephritis
 Ureteritis
 Cystitis
 Urethritis

Reproductive system

Female 
 Oophoritis
 Salpingitis
 Metritis
 Endometritis
 Myometritis
 Parametritis
 Cervicitis
 Vaginitis
 Vulvitis
 Bartholinitis
 Skenitis
Placentitis
Villitis
Intervillitis
Funisitis
Chorioamnionitis

Male 
 Orchitis
 Epididymitis
 Vasitis/Deferentitis
 Prostatitis
 Vesiculitis
 Cowperitis
 Balanitis
 Posthitis

Endocrine system 
 Insulitis
 Hypophysitis
 Thyroiditis
 Parathyroiditis
 Adrenalitis
Steatitis

Lymphatic/immune system 
 Lymphangitis
 Lymphadenitis
 Splenitis
Thymitis

References

Inflammation
Inflammations